Taunton was a town in Adams County, Washington.

A post office called Taunton operated from 1908 to 1913. The community was named by railroad officials after Taunton, Massachusetts.

References

Ghost towns in Washington (state)
Geography of Adams County, Washington